41P/Tuttle–Giacobini–Kresák is a periodic comet in the Solar System. The comet nucleus is estimated to be 1.4 kilometers in diameter.

Discovered by Horace Parnell Tuttle on May 3, 1858, and re-discovered independently by Michel Giacobini and Ľubor Kresák in 1907 and 1951 respectively, it is a member of the Jupiter family of comets.

2006 apparition 
As of June 1, 2006, Comet 41P was a 10th magnitude object for telescopes, located on the Cancer-Leo border, with a predicted maximum of about 10 at perihelion on June 11. This comet is of interest as it has been noted to flare dramatically. In 1973 the flare was 10 magnitudes brighter than predicted, reaching easy naked-eye visibility at apparent magnitude 4. However, by June 22, the comet had diminished to about magnitude 11, having produced no flare of note.

2011 apparition 
The comet was not observed during the 2011 unfavorable apparition since the perihelion passage occurred when the comet was on the far side of the Sun.

2017 apparition 
41P was recovered on November 10, 2016, at apparent magnitude 21 by Pan-STARRS. On April 1, 2017, the comet passed  from the Earth. The comet was expected to brighten to around magnitude 7 and be visible in binoculars.

Proposed exploration
In the 1960s European Space Research Organisation investigated sending a probe to the comet.

References

External links 
 Orbital simulation from JPL (Java) / Horizons Ephemeris
 41P/Tuttle-Giacobini-Kresak at the Minor Planet Center's Database
 41P at Kronk's Cometography

Periodic comets
041P
0041
Comets in 2017
18580503